Darwin was a coal mining town near Laredo in west central Webb County, Texas, United States at the confluence of the Rio Grande and Santo Tomas creek near the present day Colombia-Solidarity International Bridge. It was founded in 1882 after coal was found near the area. It was named after David Darwin Davis, the Cannel Coal Company owner. In 1914, the town's population grew to 800 and the Rio Grande and Eagle Pass Railroad was built to transport the coal extracted in nearby mines. By 1939 the mines were shut down and the population declined to 75. Today, Darwin is a ghost town where all that remains is a cemetery.

References

Geography of Webb County, Texas
Ghost towns in South Texas